Colette Hiller is an American actress who starred on film, theatre and television. She attended the Performing Arts Academy in New York as a teenager, and appeared in the original musical play of Annie, and in other films and plays such as The Lonely Lady, Ragtime, Strong Medicine, and Birth of the Beatles. She played Corporal Ferro  in the 1986 film Aliens. Hiller has also worked for the BBC, creating documentaries such as Too Clever by Half and the children's music cassette Applehead.

As its Creative Director, Hiller was instrumental in setting up SingLondon in 2007.  In 2009, in addition to various song related events, Hiller drove the Street Pianos project which saw pianos placed in London's public spaces, and freely available for people to play.  The SingLondon project went on to spawn PingLondon, a project which in 2010 placed ping pong tables around London  and, in 2011, the major cities of the UK.  Also in 2011, SingLondon produced Search Party  which took the form of a treasure hunt across London culminating in a party and which was part of the Cultural Olympiad in the run up to the 2012 Olympics.   2011 also saw SingLondon and Hiller's involvement with Keep Britain Tidy in the form of the singing bins initiative.

Filmography

References

External links 
 

American film actresses
American television actresses
American musical theatre actresses
Year of birth missing (living people)
Living people
21st-century American women